Ian's Pizza is an American pizza chain based in Wisconsin. The business has locations in Milwaukee and Seattle, among other cities.

See also 

 List of pizza chains of the United States

References

External links 
 
 
 Ian's Pizza at the Food Network

Pizza chains of the United States
Restaurants in Milwaukee
Restaurants in Seattle